Arica was a historical province of Peru, which existed between 1823 and 1883. It was populated by pre-Hispanic peoples for a long period of time before Spanish colonisation in the early 16th century saw the transformation of a small town into a thriving port. Trade in both gold and silver  was facilitated through Arica after the precious metals were first extracted from the Potosí silver mines of Bolivia. Following the War of the Pacific, the province was transferred to Chile and became an official Chilean territory in 1929.

History
The department was located in southern Peru, near the Pacific Ocean. It was limited to the north by the Tacna Province, in the south by the Tarapacá Department, on the east by Bolivia, and on the west by the Pacific Ocean.

Arica was established in 1823, as part of the Department of Arequipa. In 1828, the capital city of the province was changed from Arica to Tacna. In 1837, the province joined the established Department Litoral with capital at Tacna. In 1853, the province was moved to the newly established Department of Moquegua, along with the provinces of Moquegua, Tacna and Tarapacá. In 1855, the province was divided into two, forming the provinces of Tacna and Arica. 

In 1868, the city of Arica was almost completely destroyed during an earthquake that also affected the areas north of the city, as well neighboring Bolivia and Chile.

In 1875, Arica was transferred to the newly established Department of Tacna, along with the provinces of Tacna and Tarata. In 1875, the province itself was divided into six districts: Arica, Belén, Codpa, Livilcar, Lluta, and Socoroma. In the 1883 Treaty of Ancón Arica and Tacna provinces were transferred to Chilean control for ten years, and then were to have been subject to a plebiscite, one that was never held. De facto, that was the end of the Peruvian province of Arica, although the dispute was not settled until the 1929 Treaty of Lima.

Notable people
Guillermo Billinghurst, President of Peru
Gerardo Vargas Hurtado, Author and journalist who campaigned for Arica and Tacna to return to Peru during the Tacna-Arica dispute.

See also
 Tarapacá Department (Peru)
 Treaty of Ancón
 Treaty of Lima (1929)
 Tacna Province (Chile)
 War of the Pacific
 Battle of Arica

Notes

References

External links 
Providing that the city of Tacna, is the capital of the province of Arica
Providing that in the provinces of Tacna and Tarapaca, forming a departamento litoral
Again creating the province of Arica in the department of Moquegua

History of Peru